Sturmer railway station was a station that served the village of Sturmer, Essex, England.

The station and line closed in 1967 as part of the Beeching cuts.

The station building still stands today as a private residence.

References

External links
 Sturmer station on navigable 1946 O. S. map
 

Disused railway stations in Essex
Former Great Eastern Railway stations
Railway stations in Great Britain opened in 1865
Railway stations in Great Britain closed in 1967
Beeching closures in England